George Arthur Barker (15 April 1812 – 2 March 1876) was an English song composer and tenor singer.

Born in London, he became well known as an opera singer and recitalist, both in England and Scotland.  He was also a prolific songwriter, his best known songs including "The Irish Emigrant" (1846), "Scottish Blue Bells" (1846), and "White Squall" (1847).  Many of his songs were issued in the ten-volume Song Albums, published from 1853, and his Songs of the Army and Navy (1855).

Barker died in Aylestone, Leicestershire, in 1876.

References

External links
 Works by George Barker at the International Music Score Library Project.

1812 births
1876 deaths
English classical composers
English Romantic composers
19th-century classical composers
English male classical composers
19th-century English musicians
People from Aylestone
19th-century British composers
19th-century British male musicians